The 1974 Rhode Island Rams football team represented the University of Rhode Island in the 1974 NCAA Division II football season. They were led by fifth year head coach Jack Gregory and finished the season 5–5 overall and 3–3 in the Yankee Conference, placing in a four-way tie for third.

Schedule

References

Rhode Island
Rhode Island Rams football seasons
1974 in sports in Rhode Island